The Elder Son is a 2006 American comedy-drama film written and directed by Maryus Vaysberg and Scott Sturgeon. It is based upon the play of the same name by Alexander Vampilov.

Plot
Maxim Sarafanov (Rade Šerbedžija) has just been fired from the orchestra he played clarinet in, his son Nikita (Reiley McClendon) is in love with his schoolteacher Susan (Regina Hall), and his daughter Lolita (Leelee Sobieski) is to marry pilot Greg (Brian Geraghty) and move to Texas. But things get worse when a small-time car thief Bo (Shane West) looking for a hideout from the police tells Maxim that he is his son from Maxim's old girlfriend towards whom he still has feelings.

Cast
Shane West as Bo
Leelee Sobieski as Lolita Sarafanov
Rade Šerbedžija as Maxim Sarafanov
Eric Balfour as Skip
Regina Hall as Susan
Reiley McClendon as Nikita Sarafanov
Brian Geraghty as Greg

References

External links

 
 

Films directed by Maryus Vaysberg
2006 films
American comedy-drama films
2006 comedy-drama films
2000s English-language films
2000s American films